opened to the immediate northeast of Himeji Castle in Himeji, Hyōgo Prefecture, Japan in 1983. The collection of over 200,000 items includes one Important Cultural Property — a painting on silk of the parinirvana of the Buddha, dating to the Kamakura period — and five Prefectural Tangible Cultural Properties.

See also

 List of Historic Sites of Japan (Hyōgo)
 Hyōgo Prefectural Museum of Archaeology
 Hyōgo Prefectural Museum of Art
 Museum of Nature and Human Activities, Hyōgo

References

External links
  Hyōgo Prefectural Museum of History
  Hyōgo Prefectural Museum of History

Museums in Hyōgo Prefecture
Buildings and structures in Himeji
History museums in Japan
Museums established in 1983
1983 establishments in Japan
Prefectural museums